Niccolò Tommaseo (9 October 1802 – 1 May 1874) was a Dalmatian linguist, journalist and essayist, the editor of a  (A Dictionary of the Italian Language) in eight volumes (1861–74), of a dictionary of synonyms (1830) and other works. He is considered a precursor of the Italian irredentism.

Biography
Born at Sebenico (Šibenik), which was in quick succession under Venetian, Napoleonic and Habsburg domain, Tommaseo was culturally and ethnically Italian, but expressed also a genuine interest in the Illyrian popular culture. His education, pursued at Spalato (Split), was a humanistic one with a sound Catholic basis.

He moved to Italy to graduate in law at the University of Padua in 1822. He then spent several years as a journalist roving between Padua and Milan, where he came in contact with Alessandro Manzoni and Antonio Rosmini-Serbati. In this period of life, he began his collaboration in the Antologia of Giovan Pietro Vieusseux, founder of the Gabinetto Vieusseux, the reading room and intellectual centre in Florence. He also corresponded with Petar II Petrović Njegoš of Montenegro and Medo Pucić. Nikola Tomazeo (Niccolò Tommaseo) is regarded as part of both the Italian and Serbian literary corpus according to critic Jovan Skerlić who included him in his Istorja nove srpske književnosti (1914).

Having moved to Florence in the autumn of 1827, he became a friend of Gino Capponi and soon became one of the important voices in the Antologia. In 1830 appeared the Nuovo Dizionario de' Sinonimi della lingua italiana which confirmed his public reputation. Following the protests of the Austrian government against an article defending the Greek revolution that resulted in the closure of the journal in which he was publishing, he sought voluntary exile in Paris.

During his years in Paris he published the political work Dell'Italia (1835), the volume of verses, Confessioni (1836), the historical fiction Il Duca di Atene (1837), a commentary on the Divine Comedy (1837), and his Memorie Poetiche (1838).

From Paris, he moved to Corsica, where with the support and collaboration of the magistrate and essayist of Bastia, Salvatore Viale, he worked to compile the copious Italian oral traditions of the island, where he claimed to find the purest Italian dialect in the book Canti populari: Canti Corsi.

In Venice he published the first two installments of his novel Fede e Bellezza, praised today as an early example of the psychological novel. His anthology of popular songs, Canti popolari italiani, corsi, illirici, greci (1841) and the Scintille/Iskrice (1842) are rare examples of a metropolitan culture above nationalism.

In 1847 he returned to the journalistic forum, and as an outspoken defender of liberalizing laws for a wholly free press was arrested, causing a scandal: he was freed during the liberal revolution headed by Daniele Manin and assumed responsibilities in the briefly renewed Venetian Republic, which cost him an exile (because accused of Italian irredentist) in Corfù when Habsburg control was reasserted over Lombardy-Venetia. In Corfù, with his eyesight failing, he nevertheless managed to write numerous essays, among which, in Rome et le monde (written in French), he declared, as a good Catholic, the necessity of the Church's relinquishing temporal power in the Papal States. In this time he abandoned his hopes for the "moderate" road to the Unification of Italy through the House of Savoy.

In 1854, with his sight ever more compromised, he moved to Turin (1854), then once again to Florence (1859), where he took a villa at Settignano. His opposition to the House of Savoy made him refuse all honours, including a seat in the Senate. In his final years he devoted himself to the weighty dictionary of the Italian language, in seven volumes, which was completed in 1874, after his death.

Main works
 Nuovo Dizionario de' Sinonimi della lingua italiana (1830)
 Canti popolari italiani, corsi, illirici, greci (1841)
 Le lettere di Santa Caterina di Siena (1860, 4 Bde.)
 Il secondo esilio (1862, 3 Bde.), eine Sammlung seiner politischen Schriften
 Sulla pena di morte (1865)
 Nuovi studj su Dante (1865)
 Dizionario di sinonimi della lingua italiana (7. Aufl. 1887, 2 Bde.)
 Leben Rosminis
 Dizionario estetico (neue Aufl. 1872)
 Pensiero Morali

Bibliography
 Bernardi Vita e scritti di Niccolò Tommaseo Torino, 1874
 K. Hillebrand in der Allgemeinen Zeitung (Mai 1874)

References

External links
 
 
 
 Memorie poetiche (ed. 1964)
 La questione dalmatica riguardata ne'suoi nuovi aspetti: osservazioni 1861 Niccolò Tommaseo
 Il secondo esilio, scritti concernenti le cose d'Italia e d'Europa dal 1849 ... Niccolò Tommaseo
  Nuovi studi su Dante Niccolò Tommaseo
 Vita di S. Giuseppe Calasanzio, fondatore delle Scuole Pie scritta da - Niccolò Tommaseo
 Canti popolari: Corsi illirici Niccolò Tommaseo
 Nuovo dizionario de' sinonimi della lingua italiana Niccolò Tommaseo
 Scritti di Gasparo Gozzi: con giunta d'inediti e rari, scelti, Vol: 2-3 Gasparo Gozzi (conte),Niccolò Tommaseo
 Della pena di morte Niccolò Tommaseo
 Il serio nel faceto: scitti varii Niccolò Tommaseo
 Dizionario estetico Niccolò Tommaseo

1802 births
1874 deaths
Dalmatian Italians
Italian irredentism
Italian journalists
Italian male journalists
Linguists from Italy
People from Šibenik
People from the Kingdom of Dalmatia
19th-century journalists
19th-century Italian male writers
Italian exiles